This article provides information on candidates who stood for the 1906 Australian federal election. The election was held on 12 December 1906.

By-elections, appointments and defections

By-elections and appointments

On 26 February 1904, Norman Cameron (Free Trade) was elected to replace Sir Edward Braddon (Free Trade) as the member for Wilmot.
On 30 March 1904, William Maloney (Labour) was elected to replace Sir Malcolm McEacharn (Protectionist) as the member for Melbourne. McEacharn's election in 1903 had been declared void.
On 18 May 1904, John Chanter (Protectionist) was elected to replace Robert Blackwood (Free Trade) as the member for Riverina. Blackwood's election in 1903 had been declared void.
On 12 October 1906, Isaac Isaacs (Protectionist) resigned as the member for Indi. H. B. Higgins (Protectionist) resigned as the member for Northern Melbourne the following day. Due to the proximity of the election, no by-elections were held.

Defections
In 1904, Independent MP James Wilkinson (Moreton) joined the Labour Party.
In 1904, the Free Trade Party under its leader George Reid took office from the Watson Labour Government. Protectionists Senator James Drake (Queensland), James McCay (Corinella), Allan McLean (Gippsland) and Sir George Turner (Balaclava) accepted office under Reid and effectively ended their connection with the Protectionist Party, becoming Free Trade MPs. They were joined by Richard Edwards (Oxley), Senator Simon Fraser (Victoria), Sir Philip Fysh (Denison) and James McColl (Echuca). Around this time the Revenue Tariff Party was dissolved, and its two parliamentarians, Senator Henry Dobson (Tasmania) and William McWilliams (Franklin), also became Free Traders. Protectionists Sir John Forrest (Swan) and Sir John Quick (Bendigo) also dissolved their relationship with Deakin's party, but stopped short of joining the Free Traders. They were the beginning of what became known as the "Corner" group of independent conservative protectionists.
In 1906, the Free Trade Party was renamed the Anti-Socialist Party.
In 1906, the Western Australian Party was formed. Sir John Forrest (Swan), formerly a Protectionist, ran as its endorsed candidate, but in reality remained a member of the "Corner" group.
 Anti-Socialist MP Norman Cameron (Wilmot) lost pre-selection and contested the election as an Independent.
 Labour Senator Anderson Dawson (Queensland) initially announced his intention to retire at this election. He ultimately decided to contest it, but as the Labour candidates had already been selected he ran as an Independent.
 Labour MP James Ronald (Southern Melbourne), whose seat was abolished, was unsuccessful seeking pre-selection for Melbourne Ports. He contested the election as an Independent.

Redistributions and seat changes

Redistributions of electoral boundaries occurred in New South Wales and Victoria.
In New South Wales, Bland was abolished, Cook and Nepean were created, and Canobolas was renamed Calare.
The member for Bland, Chris Watson (Labour), contested South Sydney.
The member for Canobolas, Thomas Brown (Labour), contested Calare.
In Victoria, Corinella and Moira were abolished, Maribyrnong was created, and Northern Melbourne and Southern Melbourne were renamed Batman and Fawkner respectively.
The member for Corinella, James McCay (Anti-Socialist), contested Corio.
The member for Echuca, James McColl (Anti-Socialist), contested the Senate.
The member for Flinders, James Gibb (Anti-Socialist), contested the New South Wales seat of Hume.
The member for Grampians, Thomas Skene (Anti-Socialist), contested the Senate.
The member for Melbourne Ports, Samuel Mauger (Protectionist), contested Maribyrnong.
The member for Moira, Thomas Kennedy (Protectionist), contested Echuca.
The member for Southern Melbourne, James Ronald (Independent), contested Melbourne Ports.

Retiring Members and Senators

Protectionist
 Sir Langdon Bonython MP (Barker, SA)
 Pharez Phillips MP (Wimmera, Vic)
Senator James Drake (Qld)
Senator Sir William Zeal (Vic)

Free Trade
 George Edwards MP (South Sydney, NSW)
 Sir George Turner MP (Balaclava, Vic) – elected as Protectionist
Senator Sir Richard Baker (SA)
Senator Alexander Matheson (WA)
Senator Staniforth Smith (WA)

House of Representatives
Sitting members at the time of the election are shown in bold text.
Successful candidates are highlighted in the relevant colour. Where there is possible confusion, an asterisk (*) is also used.

New South Wales

Queensland

South Australia

Tasmania

Victoria

Western Australia

Senate
Sitting senators are shown in bold text. Tickets that elected at least one Senator are highlighted in the relevant colour. Successful candidates are identified by an asterisk (*).

New South Wales
Three seats were up for election. The Anti-Socialist Party was defending three seats. Anti-Socialist Senators John Gray, John Neild and Edward Pulsford were not up for re-election.

Queensland

Three seats were up for election. The Protectionist Party had held one seat. The Labour Party was defending two seats. Labour Senators Thomas Givens, James Stewart and Harry Turley were not up for re-election.

South Australia
Three seats were up for election. The Protectionist Party was defending one seat. The Anti-Socialist Party was defending two seats. Labour Senators Robert Guthrie, Gregor McGregor and William Story were not up for re-election.

Tasmania
Three seats were up for election. The Protectionist Party was defending one seat. The Anti-Socialist Party was defending one seat. The Labour Party was defending one seat. Protectionist Senator Edward Mulcahy and Anti-Socialist Senators Henry Dobson and James Macfarlane were not up for re-election.

Victoria
Three seats were up for election. The Protectionist Party was defending three seats. Protectionist Senator Robert Best, Labour Senator Edward Findley and Independent Senator William Trenwith were not up for re-election.

Western Australia
Three seats were up for election. The Anti-Socialist Party had held two seats. The Labour Party was defending one seat. Labour Senators John Croft, Hugh de Largie and George Henderson were not up for re-election.

See also
 1906 Australian federal election
 Members of the Australian House of Representatives, 1903–1906
 Members of the Australian House of Representatives, 1906–1910
 Members of the Australian Senate, 1904–1906
 Members of the Australian Senate, 1907–1910
 List of political parties in Australia

References
Adam Carr's Election Archive - House of Representatives 1906
Adam Carr's Election Archive - Senate 1906

1906 in Australia
Candidates for Australian federal elections